Under New Management is a Canadian television reality series, which premiered on CBC Television on March 15, 2019. Hosted by Canadian venture capitalist Arlene Dickinson, the series features Dickinson guiding aspiring business owners through the process of buying a company.

CBC broadcast the series pilot in 2017 as a special, with two investors who were each guided by Dickinson through three potential businesses. The network announced in 2018 that it had ordered a full series, which started on March 15, 2019.

Episodes

References

External links

CBC Television original programming
2010s Canadian reality television series
2019 Canadian television series debuts